is a fighting game, the second entry in the Tekken series. It was originally released for arcades in 1995, and ported to the PlayStation a year later. The arcade version was later released in Tekken 5s Arcade History mode for the PlayStation 2.

There are 10+ playable Tekken Fighters in the game's arcade version and up to 25 on the roster in total, including eight new ones in the console version. The home version also introduced new, now-staple game modes to the series. Tekken 2 was a critical as well as commercial success, becoming one of the best-selling PlayStation games with about 40,000 arcade units and  PlayStation copies sold worldwide. It was followed by a sequel, Tekken 3, in 1997.

Gameplay
The gameplay in Tekken 2 is much like its predecessor with a few additions. It continues to use 2D backgrounds in its stages, an infinite playing field and a fighting system that utilizes four buttons: left punch, right punch, left kick and right kick. Distinct additions included attack reversals for some characters, back throws, chain-throws and a sidestep unique to two characters, Kazuya Mishima and Heihachi Mishima. However, Yoshimitsu has a spinning sidestep move that lowers his health. Tackles were also modified to inflict damage when running from a greater distance. Each time the game is beaten with one of the default available characters in arcade mode, the associated sub-boss character becomes selectable.

Tekken 2 also introduced various modes that would become staples to the series. These include Survival mode, Team Battle mode and Time Attack mode. Survival mode takes the player through an endless number of matches to see how many opponent they can defeat without being defeated themselves. In addition, any health lost during a match will carry over to the next match, but the player would regain a little bit more health. Team Battle mode allows the player to select up to eight characters to participate single-round matches. Like Survival mode, any health lost during a match will carry over to the next match, but the player will regain a small amount. The player will also keep their character for the next match until they are eliminated, in which the next character will take their place. The mode ends when all characters on either team are eliminated. Time Attack mode is similar to Arcade mode, except it is played to see how fast the player can go through it and beat records.

Characters

The game features a total of 25 fighters, consisting of 8 newcomers and 17 returning veterans. Characters who were clones in the original game have been made into distinct playable characters, although they still share many moves with the originals. Devil Kazuya, originally a bonus palette swap of Kazuya reserved for the home console version of the first game, is also made as a full playable character and serves as this game's final boss.

Out of the 25 playable fighters, only 10 are available by default, with the rest being made available through updates (the arcade version) or by clearing the Arcade Mode with different characters (the console version). Like the first game, the character select screen only displays the 10 default ones, with the others being selected by scrolling past the screen to the left or right. The screen normally defaults the character option to Jun Kazama, but the arcade version contains a code that can toggle it to Baek Doo San and vice versa.

New characters
 Alex  : A genetically-altered boxing dinosaur.
 Angel  : A mysterious entity connected to Kazuya.
 Baek Doo San : A Tae Kwon Do practitioner who participates in the tournament to challenge Marshall Law.
 Bruce Irvin : A Muay Thai kickboxer who suffers from amnesia and is now serving as one of Kazuya's personal bodyguards.
 Jack-2: An updated Jack model who replaces the previous Jack and is sent to battle P. Jack.
 Jun Kazama: A mixed martial artist and animal rights activist sent to arrest Kazuya.
 Lei Wulong: A Hong Kong cop practicing Five Animals Kung-Fu who also sent to arrest Kazuya.
 Roger : A genetically-altered boxing kangaroo.

Returning characters

 Unlockable character
 Skin/palette swap

Plot
Two years after the events of the King of Iron Fist Tournament, the Mishima Zaibatsu, under the leadership of Kazuya Mishima, has become more corrupt and powerful than ever before, and is involved in many illegal operations. While his father Heihachi Mishima was rather ruthless in his endeavors, Kazuya acts completely without a conscience. He hires assassins to eliminate any of his critics and rivals, attempts to extort money from several businesses and organizations, and smuggles endangered species to conduct genetic experiments on them. The reason for his evil deeds is because he has allowed the Devil Gene within him to consume him as a result of his hatred towards Heihachi.

Meanwhile, Kazuya is sentenced to being arrested by animal rights activist and operative Jun Kazama for his experiments. Heihachi on the other hand, whom Kazuya had defeated and thrown off a cliff two years ago, has climbed back up and is training himself, plotting to overthrow Kazuya. In an attempt to rid himself of Heihachi and his enemies once and for all, Kazuya announces the King of Iron Fist Tournament 2, with a large cash prize of one trillion dollars, knowing that Heihachi will appear.

Nina Williams was contracted again to assassinate the current head of Mishima Zaibatsu, Kazuya, by entering the tournament, but her sister, Anna, intervened and was defeated by her, as a result a conflict prevented her from fulfilling the assignment. Shortly thereafter, both sisters were captured by Kazuya's corps and were used as guinea pigs in Dr. Bosconovitch's "cold sleep" project - a cryonic experiment. They did not wake for 15 years.

When Jun enters the tournament and eventually comes face to face with Kazuya, she tries to arrest him, but instead the both of them can not help being drawn to one another, propelled by a mystic force beyond Jun's control. Besides her duty to arrest Kazuya, who smuggles protected animals, she wants to free Kazuya of his evil power and drops out of the tournament as a result. Meanwhile, during the tournament, Heihachi defeats the opposing fighters including his adopted son Lee Chaolan, who had sided with Kazuya and worked for him at the Zaibatsu, but he was defeated by Kazuya's old rival, Paul Phoenix in the semi-finals of the tournament. Paul had earned the right to have a rematch with Kazuya.

In the finals of the tournament, Heihachi replaces Paul when he was forced to forfeit after getting stuck in traffic as a result of a multi-car collision on the expressway, and therefore unable to make the match on time. At some point during this time, Jun became pregnant with Kazuya's child, whilst Jun was able to cause conflict within Kazuya, swaying Devil's hold over him, ultimately she was unable to prevent him from going to meet his father, Heihachi, in the tournament finals, Heihachi confronts Kazuya and they battle once again. The Devil Gene takes over Kazuya's body, resulting in Kazuya becoming Devil. However, despite this, Kazuya is not strong enough to overpower Heihachi because of the internal conflict within him, between his evil side - represented by Devil within him - and his good side - represented by an unknown entity called Angel, which was brought forth after his meeting with Jun. After defeating Kazuya in the finals, Heihachi takes Kazuya's unconscious body to a volcano, and throws him into it before escaping on a helicopter just as the volcano erupts behind him, having taken his revenge and regained the Mishima Zaibatsu. In the meantime, Jun gives birth to Kazuya's illegitimate son, resulting in her leaving everything behind to raise their child.

Development and release
Each of the characters in Tekken 2 is composed of roughly 800 polygons and took between three days and a week to model. Roger the Kangaroo originated as a pet project of one of the development team members, who designed and modeled the character in his free time. When he showed Roger to some of his colleagues in the development team, they pushed to include the character in the game. Much of the time developing the PlayStation conversion was devoted to rewriting the code to fit the console's memory, which is roughly half the size of the game data used in the arcade version.

Tekken 2s port to the PlayStation includes unique CGI endings for every character and numerous modes such as Survival, Time Attack, Team Battle, and Practice mode. It also contains arranged music, like the port of the first game. The arrangements were handled by a large team consisting of original composer Yoshie Arakawa, Shinji Hosoe, Ayako Saso, Nobuyoshi Sano, Takayuki Aihara, Hiroto Sasaki, and Keiichi Okabe, while additional music was composed by Akira Nishizaki, Takashi Furukawa and Hideaki Mitsui.

Tekken 5 on the PlayStation 2 features the emulated arcade version of Tekken 2 (Ver. B) as a playable bonus. Tekken 2 standalone is also available for the PlayStation 3, PlayStation Portable, and the Zeebo via ZeeboNet.

Reception

Commercial
In Japan, Game Machine listed Tekken 2 on their September 15, 1995 issue as being the most-successful arcade game of the month. It went on to become a major worldwide arcade hit. In Japan, it sold about 15,000 arcade units and became the highest-grossing arcade video game of 1996. It was also highly successful overseas, selling 25,000 arcade units outside of Japan, for a total of about 40,000 arcade units sold worldwide . In the United States, RePlay reported Tekken 2 was the second most-popular arcade game at the time. It also topped the Play Meter arcade conversion kit chart in March 1996, and became one of the top five highest-grossing arcade conversion kits of 1996. In Australia, it was the fourth top-grossing arcade conversion kit in March 1996.

The PlayStation port also became a major worldwide hit. In North America, it sold nearly  copies within four months. In Europe, it sold 420,000 copies by December 1996, becoming the year's second best-selling PlayStation game in Europe. In Germany, it received a Gold award from the Verband der Unterhaltungssoftware Deutschland for sales above 100,000 copies. Worldwide sales of the PlayStation version exceeded  units by early 1998, and  units .

Critical
The game was acclaimed by game critics, with the PlayStation version holding a 93% rating at GameRankings. Critics praised the game's light sourcing, fluid character movement, detailed backgrounds, complex system of moves and combos, accessibility to inexperienced gamers, large set of playable characters, and the practice mode, which several critics predicted would become a standard feature in fighting games. Crispen Boyer of Electronic Gaming Monthly called it "the best 3-D fighting game you can find for any system" and GamePro, further comparing it to fighting games still in development, assured gamers that it would be at least a year before Tekken 2 would be topped. It received a number of Game of the Year awards from various publications.

Next Generation reviewed the arcade version of the game, and stated that "It's the style of body slamming and wrestling moves that sets this game apart from its closest cousin, Virtua Fighter 2, which makes it of interest. And the variation of moves and combinations surely place this game near the top of the heap, though the game is still not truly 3D in viewing perspective."

In 1996, GamesMaster ranked the game 12th on their "Top 100 Games of All Time." In 1997, PSM named the PlayStation port of Tekken 2 one of the "Top 25 PlayStation Games of All Time" at number three, describing it as better than the arcade version in many regards due to added features and "one of the best fighting games ever." It was also listed among the best games of all time by Next Generation in 1996, Electronic Gaming Monthly (both staff and readers) in 1997, Game Informer in 2001, GameSpot in 2006, Empire in 2009, and Guinness World Records in 2009.

Footballer David James was a notable fan of the game, crediting his passion for the game as the reason why his performance declined.

Legacy
In 2022, Tekken 2 was added to the premium collection of PlayStation Plus.

Notes

References

External links
  (archived)

1995 video games
Dinosaurs in video games
Golden Joystick Award winners
Grand Canyon in fiction
Hebei in fiction
Multiplayer and single-player video games
Namco arcade games
PlayStation (console) games
PlayStation Network games
Sichuan in fiction
Sony Interactive Entertainment games
Tekken games
Uttar Pradesh in fiction
Video game sequels
Video games about revenge
Video games developed in Japan
Video games scored by Shinji Hosoe
Video games set in Arizona
Video games set in Athens
Video games set in Cambodia
Video games set in China
Video games set in Greece
Video games set in Hong Kong
Video games set in India
Video games set in Japan
Video games set in Kyoto
Video games set in London
Video games set in Mexico
Video games set in New York City
Video games set in Seoul
Video games set in Tokyo
Video games set in Utah
Video games set in Wiltshire
Zeebo games